The Seagate Seven is an external hard disk drive product announced by Seagate Technology during the 2015 Consumer Electronics Show. It has a capacity of 500 GB with a thickness of 7mm.

Reception
Reviewers from PC Magazine, CNET and TechRadar noted the Seagate Seven's slim design, but also its relatively high price for its capacity.

References

Portable hard drives
Computer-related introductions in 2015
Seagate Technology